Robert-Jacques de Joly (Paris – , Montpellier) was a famous French caver and speleologist. Considered by some as the successor to Édouard-Alfred Martel (the "father of modern speleology"), de Joly was a leading figure of French speleology between the world wars (along with Norbert Casteret) and into the 1960s.

De Joly was an active cave explorer throughout his entire life, from age fourteen until shortly before his death at the age of eighty. He was known for his physical strength and strong personality, and was responsible for inspiring and training many successful and influential cavers. De Joly is credited with the invention of the lightweight, portable steel-cable ('electron') ladder, a tool that expanded the possibilities of cave explorations and became standard caving equipment for the next fifty years.

De Joly traveled throughout Europe and North America representing France at speleological conferences. His reputation was such that he was tasked with many commissions from various government departments.

De Joly authored numerous articles and three books, including  which was later translated into English as Memoirs of a Speleologist and continues to inspire generations of cavers today.

Honours 
 Grand Bronze Medal of the Touring Club de France (1928)
 Ministry of Education award (1936)
 Medal for Research and Invention (1958)
 Gold Medal for Tourism (1960)

References

Sources 
 

1887 births
1968 deaths
Sportspeople from Paris
French cavers
French speleologists